US Post Office-Oxford is a historic post office building located at Oxford in Chenango County, New York, United States. It was built in 1939–1940, and is one of a number of post offices in New York State designed by the Office of the Supervising Architect of the Treasury Department under Louis A. Simon.   It is a one-story, five-bay, steel-frame structure on a raised, poured-concrete foundation with a molded-brick watercourse.  It's square, with a slate-covered hipped roof in the Colonial Revival style. The interior features a 1941 mural by Mordi Gassner titled "Family Reunion on Clark Island: Spring 1791."  It is located within the Oxford Village Historic District.

It was listed on the National Register of Historic Places in 1989.

References

Oxford
Government buildings completed in 1940
Colonial Revival architecture in New York (state)
Buildings and structures in Chenango County, New York
National Register of Historic Places in Chenango County, New York